Deh Now-e Olya or Dehnow Olya or Deh Now-ye Olya or Dehnow-ye Olya or Dehnow-e Olya may refer to:
 Deh Now-ye Olya, Kiar, Chaharmahal and Bakhtiari Province
 Dehnow-ye Olya, Kuhrang, Chaharmahal and Bakhtiari Province
 Deh Now-e Olya, Hamadan